SpongeBob SquarePants: The Broadway Musical (originally titled The SpongeBob Musical, later retitled as such for the national tour) is a stage musical, co-conceived and directed by Tina Landau with songs by various artists and a book by Kyle Jarrow. It is based on the Nickelodeon animated television series SpongeBob SquarePants and made its world premiere in June 2016 at the Oriental Theatre in Chicago. Following a month of previews, the musical opened on Broadway at the Palace Theatre in December 2017.

The show was produced by Nickelodeon, The Araca Group, Sony Music Masterworks and Kelp on the Road.

The musical opened to critical acclaim. With twelve Tony Award nominations, it tied with Mean Girls for the most-nominated production at the 72nd Tony Awards in 2018. The show closed at the Palace Theatre on September 16, 2018 due to theatre renovations. At the time of its closing, it had played 29 previews and 327 regular performances. A non-Equity North American tour opened on September 22, 2019 at Proctors Theatre in Schenectady, New York. The tour closed in 2020 due to the ongoing COVID-19 pandemic. On December 7, 2019, Nickelodeon aired a television special of the show featuring members from the original Broadway cast. The SpongeBob Musical is scheduled to resume touring in the UK in 2023.

Development
On January 16, 2014, The Flaming Lips' lead singer Wayne Coyne mentioned through Twitter that he was writing lyrics for a developing SpongeBob musical. Official plans for the show were first announced at Nickelodeon's upfront on February 25, 2015. The upfront presentation included a performance of the musical's opening number, "Bikini Bottom Day." On February 26, Nickelodeon's chief operating officer Sarah Kirshbaum Levy told the Associated Press that the show was "not definite."

In August 2015, Nickelodeon announced that the show would premiere in Chicago before a Broadway run in late 2016. Its director, book author, and several of the musicians involved were also announced. The full cast list was released in April 2016. Rehearsals for the show's debut in Chicago began on April 11 in New York. Throughout early 2016, Nickelodeon executives met with Broadway theater owners to arrange its Broadway premiere. Michael Reidel of New York Post stated that Broadway representatives were "impressed" after seeing a presentation of the show.

In late May 2016, technical rehearsals for the show were conducted. Chris Jones of Chicago Tribune stated that Nickelodeon was concerned about "an incomplete SpongeBob costume [making] it into a photograph, spoiling a planned big reveal." In June 2016, Gordon Cox of Variety reported that the musical's budget was between $15 and $20 million. The show opened on June 7, 2016 at the Oriental Theatre in Chicago before opening on Broadway on December 4, 2017 at the Palace Theatre.

Synopsis

Pre-Show
Patchy the Pirate, SpongeBob's number one fan, sits on the stage after the audience has taken their seats. He reveals he has traveled from Encino, California, to record the musical on his phone and make a "pirate copy". Two security guards tell Patchy to leave, as the show is about to begin. Patchy objects but gets kicked out as Patchy claims he is a victim of pirate discrimination and sings a protest chant, "yo ho, we won't go". One of the guards apologizes, then tells the audience to enjoy the show. In the television special, this prologue is replaced by an animated segment about theatre etiquette.

Act One
SpongeBob SquarePants awakens and welcomes the day with his pet sea snail, Gary ("Bikini Bottom Day"). He greets various friends in his hometown of Bikini Bottom—including his best friend Patrick, his neighbor Squidward, and his friend Sandy Cheeks—as he walks to the Krusty Krab restaurant. At work, his boss Mr. Krabs tells his daughter Pearl that she will manage the restaurant one day. With Pearl uninterested, SpongeBob hints at his desire to become the manager. Mr. Krabs laughs at the idea, telling SpongeBob he is "just a simple sponge" ("Bikini Bottom Day" (Reprise 1)). Then, a violent tremor suddenly rocks the entire town.

A news report reveals that the tremor was caused by the nearby Mount Humongous, a volcano that will soon erupt, throwing the town into a panic ("No Control"). SpongeBob cheers up an upset Patrick by reiterating that they are best friends forever ("BFF"). With the town in a panic over the impending doom, married villains Plankton and Karen try to convince the citizens to enter an escape pod that ensures safety—a cover-up for their secret scheme to hypnotize the citizens in the pod into liking the chum that they serve at their restaurant, the Chum Bucket ("When the Going Gets Tough"). The townspeople, unknowingly, support this idea and decide to hold a last-minute music concert to raise enough money to build the pod. Squidward's idea of his one-man show is immediately shut down. Instead, Pearl suggests that the famous rock band, the Electric Skates, play at the concert. Everyone agrees and Squidward is named manager of the event. Despite Sandy's pleas that science could help them solve the problem, the townsfolk ignore her for being a land mammal.

SpongeBob, however, is against the idea of leaving town and believes the citizens should save Bikini Bottom. SpongeBob thinks back on Mr. Krabs' words from earlier and wonders if he could save the town ("(Just a) Simple Sponge"). He goes to Patrick and Sandy for help. Mr. Krabs sees the upcoming disaster as a money-making opportunity, holding an "apocalypse sale". Pearl worries about her father's greed, believing that it overshadows his care for her ("Daddy Knows Best").

Meanwhile, SpongeBob convinces Patrick and Sandy to team up, climb the volcano, and stop it from erupting with a bubble device Sandy will build. The friends are determined to succeed ("Hero Is My Middle Name"). Before they start their plan, a group of cultist sardines appear. They found wisdom in Patrick's thoughts at the town meeting and decide to make him their new leader ("Super Sea Star Savior"). Patrick likes the idea and decides to back out of SpongeBob's plan so that he can bask in self-glory, angering SpongeBob. The two argue and end their "BFF" status. After Patrick leaves, Sandy reminds SpongeBob that things are bound to be okay. The entire company reveals their personal thoughts and feelings about the impending disaster ("Tomorrow Is").

Act Two
Patchy again sneaks onstage, telling the audience that pirates are persecuted by others because of stereotypes ("Poor Pirates"), supported in song by a group of pirates he met during the show's first act after wandering into a dive bar in the nearby Hell's Kitchen. (In the Chicago run, he stated he was "walking around the Chicago Loop.") The theater's security again intervenes to chase Patchy away as he screams that he'll be back.

SpongeBob wakes up and greets a new day—the day when the volcano is expected to erupt ("Bikini Bottom Day" (Reprise 2)). Bikini Bottom has fallen into anarchy and chaos: the mayor has employed a dictatorship over the people and an angry mob has started to hunt down Sandy, thinking her science is the cause for the volcano's impending eruption. Sandy hides from the mob and shows SpongeBob the ingenious bubble device, the Eruptor Interrupter. They plan to throw it inside the volcano and save the town.

Back in Bikini Bottom, Plankton worries that Sandy and SpongeBob will successfully climb up the mountain and save the town, but Karen tells him that she found his misplaced avalanche maker, saying they can use it to create an avalanche to kill SpongeBob and Sandy. The Electric Skates finally arrive ("Bikini Bottom Boogie") and accept Squidward's request to join their opening act if Squidward buys every item on a long shopping list. Meanwhile, SpongeBob and Sandy make their way up the volcano with great difficulty and Sandy tries to increase their morale, encouraging them to never give up ("Chop to the Top"). SpongeBob cannot help but think of how he misses Patrick and wishes he were there to help them. In Bikini Bottom, Patrick finds life as a guru unexciting and misses SpongeBob as well, prompting him to leave his followers behind to help SpongeBob ("(I Guess) I Miss You").

Squidward obtains all but one of the items on the Electric Skates' list, so the band refuses his request and call him a "loser". In response, Squidward, who was called a loser in his childhood, snaps back at the band in anger. As the band quits and leaves, Squidward insists that he is not a loser and performs a song with a tap dance number and back-up chorus, but becomes depressed again when he realizes that it was all in his imagination ("I'm Not a Loser"). However, with the band gone, there is no concert or escape pod. Pearl suggests Mr. Krabs hand over his money to build the escape pod, but even he cannot meet the price and the town citizens panic and fight one another. Back on the mountain, Plankton and Karen use the avalanche maker to cause an avalanche, sending SpongeBob falling off the mountain. Patrick arrives and saves him with a jetpack Sandy invented, and the two reaffirm their friendship and follow Sandy to the summit of the mountain. When they reach the top, neither Sandy nor Patrick are able to reach the rim where they need to throw the device in. They turn to SpongeBob, who doubts his skills ("(Just a) Simple Sponge" (Reprise)). They remind him that he is the only one who can squeeze through tight areas and that his optimism has gotten them this far. His determination renewed, SpongeBob throws the Eruptor Interrupter in. The three soon discover the chaos Bikini Bottom is in and immediately parachute down to the town to stop the fighting from escalating further.

SpongeBob tries to calm everyone down, insisting that, despite whatever happens, they have each other ("Best Day Ever"). When the time comes for the volcano to erupt, everyone braces for their potential deaths. However, time passes with no eruption and bubbles fall down from above, signalling that Sandy's invention worked. With Bikini Bottom safe, everyone apologizes for their behavior, as Plankton and Karen argue and accidentally reveal their secret plot. Mr. Krabs decides to have SpongeBob as manager of the Krusty Krab someday. Everyone then decides that they should celebrate by having a new concert led by Pearl and Squidward, much to his delight, as Sandy is now welcomed back by the citizens of Bikini Bottom. Patchy descends from above on a rope, having finally managed to sneak into the show. He makes the cast reluctantly agree to let him be a part of the finale as the townspeople welcome the brand new day ("Bikini Bottom Day" (Reprise 3)). During the curtain call, the cast performs one final song ("SpongeBob SquarePants Theme Song").

Musical numbers

Act I
 "Bikini Bottom Day" by Jonathan Coulton – SpongeBob, Patrick, Squidward, Sandy, Mr. Krabs, Plankton, Karen & Company
 "Bikini Bottom Day" (reprise) by Coulton – SpongeBob
 "No Control" by David Bowie & Brian Eno – Perch Perkins, SpongeBob, Mr. Krabs, Pearl, Squidward, Patrick, Sandy, Plankton, Karen & Company
 "BFF" by Plain White T's – SpongeBob & Patrick
 "When the Going Gets Tough" by T.I. – Plankton, Karen, SpongeBob & Company
 "(Just a) Simple Sponge" by Panic! at the Disco – SpongeBob & Ensemble
 "Daddy Knows Best" by Alex Ebert – Mr. Krabs & Pearl
 "Hero Is My Middle Name" by Cyndi Lauper & Rob Hyman – SpongeBob, Patrick & Sandy
 "Super Sea Star Savior" by Yolanda Adams – Patrick & Sardines
 "Tomorrow Is" by The Flaming Lips – Sandy, SpongeBob, Squidward, Mr. Krabs, Plankton, Karen & Company

Act II
 "Poor Pirates" by Sara Bareilles – Patchy & Pirates
 "Bikini Bottom Day" (reprise II) by Coulton – SpongeBob
 "Bikini Bottom Boogie" by Steven Tyler & Joe Perry – The Electric Skates, Pearl & Company
 "Chop to the Top" by Lady Antebellum – Sandy & SpongeBob
 "(I Guess I) Miss You" by John Legend – Patrick & SpongeBob
 "I'm Not a Loser" by They Might Be Giants – Squidward & Company
 "(Just a) Simple Sponge" (reprise) by Panic! at the Disco – SpongeBob
 "Best Day Ever" by Andy Paley & Tom Kenny – SpongeBob & Company
 "Bikini Bottom Day" (reprise III) by Coulton – SpongeBob & Company
 "SpongeBob SquarePants Theme Song" by Derek Drymon, Mark Harrison, Stephen Hillenburg & Blaise Smith – SpongeBob & Company

  Cut from the original airing of the TV special
  Cut from abbreviated airings of the TV special

Instrumentation
The show's Tony-nominated orchestrations by Tom Kitt utilized an orchestra of 18 for the Broadway production, including Mike Dobson who served as the live sound effects artist.

SpongeBob SquarePants Original Cast recording
On June 28, 2016, Masterworks Broadway announced that the Chicago cast would record a cast album in early August, with Masterworks producing the album. On September 14, 2017, the full cast recording was made available on the NPR website. The cast recording was released in its physical form in stores as well as on streaming sites on September 22, 2017, two months prior to the show's Broadway premiere.

All tracks are written and composed by various artists, as listed below (additional music, arrangements and orchestrations by Tom Kitt; additional lyrics by Jonathan Coulton).

Productions

Chicago try-out (2016) and Broadway (2017-18) 
SpongeBob SquarePants opened at the Oriental Theatre, Chicago on June 19, 2016. The musical began previews on Broadway at the Palace Theatre on November 6, 2017, and opened on December 4, 2017 with choreography by Christopher Gattelli, musical supervision by Tom Kitt, music direction by Julie McBride, scenic and costume design by David Zinn, lighting design by Kevin Adams, projection design by Peter Nigrini, sound design by Walter Trarbach, and hair and wig design by Charles G. LaPointe. The musical closed on September 16, 2018, after 327 regular performances, without recouping its $18 million cost, its run being cut short due to the renovation of the Palace Theatre, with the theatre being raised to make way for retail space. The New York Times noted that the musical had been financially underperforming compared with other large-scale musicals, with it running strongest during school vacation periods and bringing in $1.5 million during Christmas week, with its lowest gross being $543,000 the last week of April.

National tours 
A non-Equity North American tour opened on September 22, 2019, in Schenectady, New York, at Proctors Theatre. It was later announced that the rest of the tour had been cancelled due to the COVID-19 pandemic, which forced theaters across the nation to close.

The SpongeBob Musical: Live On Stage!
On October 17, 2019, Nickelodeon announced it would air a television special of the show titled The SpongeBob Musical: Live On Stage!, to be filmed in front of a live audience and feature members of the original Broadway cast such as Ethan Slater, Danny Skinner, and Gavin Lee. On November 19, 2019, it was announced that Tom Kenny would reprise his series role as Patchy the Pirate for the special and that it would air on December 7, 2019. The production was released on DVD on November 3, 2020, and includes both the full-length version aired in December 2019 and the sing-along version aired in January 2020.

German Tour 2022 
A German-language tour through Germany, Austria and Switzerland started on October 1, 2022 in Berlin, hence becoming the first official public display of the show outside of North America. The show is co-produced by German Nickelodeon and Showslot, a German Musical production company. The Tour stops in several cities until closing on December 17, 2022. The production was translated to German entirely with no scenes cut. It also includes the preshow by Patchy the Pirate. However all the costumes and set were redesigned, with the center of the set design being a big pineapple that can be opened. Some set pieces of the original Broadway production were downscaled or cut to accommodate for the smaller stages of some venues.

UK Tour 2023 
On October 24, 2022, it was announced that the musical would premiere in the UK with a tour starting at the Mayflower Theatre in Southampton on April 5, 2023, and would include five weeks at the Queen Elizabeth Hall in London. Venues currently announced include Birmingham, Dublin, Manchester, Belfast, Cardiff and Aberdeen, with the tour currently finishing on September 2, 2023, at the Theatre Royal in Plymouth. The cast was announced on January 26, 2023.

Cast and characters

Notable replacements
Catherine Ricafort replaced Stephanie Hsu as Karen Plankton on June 19, 2018.
Christina Sajous replaced Lilli Cooper as Sandy Cheeks on July 24, 2018.

Critical response
The original Chicago production received mostly positive reviews. Dean Richards of WGN-TV gave it an A+, writing that "the story is multi-layered for kids and adults. It all adds up to one of the most fun, well produced, and best acted shows Chicago has seen in a long time." Chris Jones of the Chicago Tribune praised the cast (particularly Slater, Skinner, Cooper, and Lee) and the production values. He wrote positively of the show's songs, writing that the musical's "biggest gamble—a score made up of singles by different songwriters and unified by orchestrator Tom Kitt—works quite beautifully." Nonetheless, he warned "the transition to Broadway now needs to involve a dialing back of excess and more attention to truth—Bikini Bottom truth, sure, but metaphoric human veracity." Similarly, Steve Oxman in Variety praised the entertainment, invention and "terrifically talented cast" but argued for a "slight shift in world view" to truly engage the broadest audience. In the Chicago Sun-Times' review, Hedy Weiss expressed praise for the set design's creativity and the coherency, but felt that it was almost too extravagant, writing that the "predictable" musical "exhausts itself long before it's over." Kendall Ashley of Nerdist described the set as "pretty darn impressive" and called the decision not to use extensive makeup on the actors "interesting." Barbara Vitello of the Daily Herald also commended the actors' costumes and performances, stating that the "imaginative costumes that add a punch of color to the glittering sea green and aquamarine backdrop are among the delights."

The Broadway production opened to similar reviews. Ben Brantley of The New York Times, called it a "ginormous giggle of a show", and particularly praised Slater's performance as the titular character. Marilyn Stasio of Variety stated the show provided a good amount of "giddy, goofy fun" for all audiences. Peter Marks of The Washington Post explained that, although the show displays "impressive design and engineering" along with "exuberant neon-colored sets and costumes", its "lumbering," "drawn-out" plot makes the show a novelty recommendable to only true fans of the source material. Alexis Soloski of The Guardian agreed, calling the main plot "bottom-feeder low" and subplots "roundly ignorable", resulting in a show that "is as perfunctorily entertaining as it is insistently forgettable."

Awards and nominations

Original Broadway production 

1 Tied with Bartlett Sher for My Fair Lady

References

External links
Internet Broadway Database
Official site
Oriental Theatre

Broadway musicals
Drama Desk Award-winning musicals
Musicals based on television series
2016 musicals
SpongeBob SquarePants
Tony Award-winning musicals
Musicals based on animated films